Grabek may refer to the following places in Poland:
Grabek, Lower Silesian Voivodeship (south-west Poland)
Grabek, Łódź Voivodeship (central Poland)
Grabek, Greater Poland Voivodeship (west-central Poland)
Grabek, Warmian-Masurian Voivodeship (north Poland)